Chinthavishtayaya Seetha is an Indian Malayalam-language soap opera. The show premiered on 29 August 2016 on Asianet and aired on weekdays at 7:00 PM IST and on-demand through Disney+ Hotstar. It starred Swasika Vijay, Bipin Jose and Shanavas Shanu in lead roles. It was the first installment of the Seetha series. The show was abruptly ended with 126 episodes.

Series Overview

Synopsis
Seetha is the only earning member of her family. She falls in love with Raman, but an unfortunate turn of events forbids them to unite.

Plot

Seetha is the sole bread earner of her family and is in love with Devan, a farmer, since childhood. Seetha's family wants get them married soon, but Seetha delays  it due to her financial hardships.

Seetha returns Gangadaran the money which her father took as a bribe leaving Gangadaran fuming and planning vengeance. Kaveri is seen with Shayju, Gangadharan's son leaving Seetha worried. Yamuna and Sugunan try to woo Kaveri and instigate her against Seetha. She soon falls for Shayju's false love for her and curses Seetha. Simultaneously, Devan's uncle is upset at the marriage's postponement and wants Devan to marry some other girl. At the other hand, Seetha’ mother asks her to marry Devan. Indran returns from Gulf gets attracted to Seetha and wants to marry her. He bribe Narayanan to force Seetha to marry Indran. Indran also meets and plots to use Giri and Sugunan who promises to get Seetha married to him. Seetha refuses to Indran's proposal leaving Kaveri, Yamuna and Narayanan fuming. But, Seetha's mother supports her.

Narayanan loses his cool and forbids Seetha from going to work and house arrests her. Shayju and his friends plot against Kaveri and attack her but she is saved by Devan. Kaveri then realizes the true face of Shayju and supports Seetha and Devan. Seeing Seetha's plight, her mother asks her to elope with Devan. Seetha bids adieu to her sleeping father, and when Devan comes to her house to take her, he is caught by Sugunan and Indran. Narayanan insults Devan who walks away and leaving both him and Seetha in tears. Indran appoints a spy Sobhan to keep an eye on Seetha while she goes to work. Seetha vows not to marry Indran.

Soon, Kaveri and Seetha learn that Kaveri is pregnant and are shattered. Seetha counsels Kaveri and tries to persuade Shayju to unite with Kaveri. On learning this, Devan confronts Shayju for ruining Kaveri's life, while Narayanan promises the villagers to get Seetha married to Indran. Later, Indran and Shayju meet and join hands against Devan and conspire to evict Devan from their lives.

Cast

Lead 

 Swasika Vijay as Seetha
 Bipin Jose as a Devan
 Shanavas Shanu as Indran

Recurring 
 Ambika Mohan as Kamala
 T.S. Raju as Narayanan
 Anushree as Kaveri
 Kishore as Sugunan
 Parvathy as Yamuna
 Manju Satheesh as Jayasree
 Joemon Joshy as Shyju
 Bindu Ramakrishnan as Devaki
 Girish Nambiar / Deepan Murali as Dr. Giri Narayanan
 Manve Surendran as Indulekha
 Manoj Nair as C.I. Durgaprasad
 Rahul Mohan as Ganesh
 Dini Daniel as Indira
 Naseer Sankranthi as Shobhan
 Jolly Easow as Indran's mother
 Shanthakumari as Ashok's mother

References

External links
 Official website
 

2017 Indian television series debuts
Malayalam-language television shows
Asianet (TV channel) original programming